Chersaecia magna is a species of air-breathing land snail, a terrestrial pulmonate gastropod mollusk in the family Plectopylidae.

Distribution
This snail occurs in Myanmar.

References

External links
 Gude G. K. (1897). Armature of Helicoid landshells and new forms of Plectopylis. Science Gossip. 3 (34): 274–276
 Páll-Gergely, B. (2018). Systematic revision of the Plectopylinae (Gastropoda, Pulmonata, Plectopylidae). European Journal of Taxonomy. (455): 1–114

Plectopylidae
Gastropods described in 1897